Castricum is a municipality and a town in the province of North Holland in the Netherlands.

Castricum is a seaside town in the province of North Holland. It draws in a fair share of tourists who mainly come to visit the beach and nearby dune landscape. In Castricum's vicinity there is also the lake of Alkmaar-Uitgeest which offers various sailing and windsurfing opportunities.

History

On 6 October 1799, a Franco-Dutch army under Guillaume Brune defeated an Anglo-Russian army under Ralph Abercromby and the Duke of York in the Battle of Castricum.

The municipalities of Akersloot and Limmen merged into the municipality of Castricum on 1 January 2002.

Population centres 
The municipality of Castricum is made up of the following towns, villages and/or districts: Castricum, Akersloot, Bakkum, De Woude, Limmen.

Transportation

The town is served by Castricum railway station. From here there are 4 trains an hour to Amsterdam, with a journey time of 28 minutes.

Local government 

The municipal council of Castricum consists of 25 seats, which are divided as follows:
 VVD - 5 seats
 Castricum Kernen Gezond (CKenG) - 3 seats
 GDB  -2 seats
 PvdA - 1 seat
 CDA - 4 seats
 Green party- 3 seats
 D66 - 2 seats
 De Vrije Lijst - 2 seats
 Forza - 1 seat
 lijst Kooter - 1 seat
 lijst van Schoonhoven - 1 seat 

At the moment, the college van burgemeester en wethouders (the municipal board) is formed by the VVD, CDA and de Vrije Lijst.

Castricum aan Zee 

Castricum aan Zee is the seaside resort of Castricum. It used to be called Bakkum aan Zee, and mainly consists of holiday homes, camping sites and the occasional house. Duincamping Bakkum is the oldest camp site of the Netherlands. The dune area used to be owned by Sophie, Princess of Albania. In 1906, a group of nature lovers asked permission to camp. The princess granted permission, and it developed into a permanent camp site.

In 1942, construction started of the Atlantic Wall to defend against an Allied invasion. As part of the wall Stützpunkt Castricum was built, and 104 bunkers were constructed in the dunes. Many have been demolished, but some are still hidden under the sand. In 2020, a previously unknown bunker was discovered buried in the sand.

Notable people 

 Willem Jacobszoon Coster (1590 in Akersloot – 1640) Dutch colonial Governor of Zeylan in 1640
 John Ton (1826 in Akersloot - 1896) an American abolitionist active in the Underground Railroad in Illinois. 
 Willem Schermerhorn (1894 in Akersloot – 1977) a Dutch politician, Prime Minister of the Netherlands 1945/1946
 Abraham Louis Schneiders (1925 in Castricum - 2020) a Dutch diplomat and writer
 Jan Gmelich Meijling (1936 in Heemstede – 2012) a Dutch politician, naval officer and Mayor of Castricum from 1978 to 1985
 Theo van den Boogaard (born 1948 in Castricum) a Dutch cartoonist
 Henk Jaap Beentje (born 1951 in Bakkum) a Dutch botanist, works at the Royal Botanic Gardens, Kew
 Sefa Jeroen Vlaarkamp (2000 in Alkmaar) a Dutch frenchcore musician

Sport 
 Arjan de Zeeuw (born 1970 in Castricum) a retired Dutch footballer with 553 club caps
 Eddy Putter (born 1982 in Akersloot) a Dutch football player with over 200 club caps
 Kees Luijckx (born 1986 in Beverwijk) a Dutch footballer with over 270 club caps
 Teun Koopmeiners (born 1998 in Castricum) a Dutch footballer playing for Atalanta Bergamo

See also
 Huis van Hilde, provincial archaeology centre in Castricum

Gallery

References

External links 

Official website

 
Municipalities of North Holland
Populated places in North Holland